Strait from the Heart is the second studio album by American country music artist George Strait, released on June 3, 1982 by MCA Records. The album includes Strait's first No. 1 single, "Fool Hearted Memory", as well as follow-up singles "Marina del Rey", "Amarillo by Morning" and "A Fire I Can't Put Out", reaching No. 6, No. 4, and No.
1 respectively on the Billboard Hot Country Singles chart. The album peaked at No. 18 on the US Billboard Top Country Albums chart. Strait from the Heart is certified platinum by the RIAA.

There were three cover songs on the album: "Honky Tonk Crazy", which had been released a couple months earlier in 1982 by the duo of Gary Stewart and Dean Dillon on their Brotherly Love album;  2) the Guy Clark song, "Heartbroke", which was first recorded by Rodney Crowell on his 1980 album, But What Will the Neighbors Think; and 3) "Amarillo by Morning" which was first recorded by Terry Stafford in 1973.  "The Only Thing I Have Left" was later recorded by Tim McGraw for his 1993 debut album Tim McGraw.

Recording
Strait from the Heart was recorded at Music City Music Hall in Nashville, Tennessee. The album was fully recorded and mixed digitally.

Reception

Strait from the Heart received positive reviews upon its release in 1982. On the music review website AllMusic, it received a perfect five out of five stars. In his review for AllMusic, Thom Jurek called Strait "a singer of uncommon vitality who could sing honky tonk, countrypolitan, and the new traditional sounds". Jurek singled out the depth and breadth of the singer's talent, delivering his first number one hit, "Fool Hearted Memory", a slow two-step, alongside the equally successful ballads "Amarillo by Morning", "Marina del Rey", and "A Fire I Can't Put Out", as well as the raw traditional numbers "Honky Tonk Crazy", "Heartbroke", "I Can't See Texas from Here", and the barroom anthem "The Steal of the Night"—songs that "offer a portrait of Strait as a man who can do it all". Jurek concludes:
 In 2022, Rolling Stone ranked the album 19 on its 100 Greatest Country Albums of All Time publication.

Track listing

Personnel
Music
 George Strait – lead vocals
 Gregg Galbraith – electric guitar
 Fred Newell – electric guitar
 Jimmy Capps – acoustic guitar
 Bobby Thompson - acoustic guitar
 Steve Chapman - acoustic guitar on "Fool Hearted Memory"
 Dave Kirby - acoustic guitar on "Fool Hearted Memory"
 Sonny Garrish – steel guitar
 John Hughey – steel guitar
 Mark Feldman - fiddle on "Fool Hearted Memory"
 Rob Hajacos – fiddle
 Buddy Spicher – fiddle
 Mitch Humphries – keyboards
 Mike Leech – bass guitar
 Larry Paxton – bass guitar
 Clyde Brooks - drums on "Fool Hearted Memory"
 Jerry Kroon – drums
 The Nashville String Machine – strings
 Sudie Callaway – background vocals
 Buddy Cannon – background vocals
 Rita Figlio – background vocals
 Arlene Hardin – background vocals
 Buddy Hardin – background vocals
 Gwen Kay – background vocals
 Curtis Young – background vocals

Production
 Blake Mevis – producer
 Bill Harris – engineer, mixing
 Doug Crider – assistant engineer
 David DeBusk – assistant engineer
 Milan Bogdan – digital editing 
 Glenn Meadows – digital mastering 
 Allen Moore – string arrangements
 Simon Levy – art direction
 Jim McGuire – photography
 Katie Gillon – coordination
 Sherri Halford – coordination

Chart positions

References

1982 albums
George Strait albums
MCA Records albums